Chattarhat railway station is a railway station on Katihar–Siliguri branch of Howrah–New Jalpaiguri line in the Katihar railway division of Northeast Frontier Railway zone. It is situated at Paschim Bansgaon Kismat, Chattarhat of Darjeeling district in the Indian state of West Bengal.

References

Railway stations in Darjeeling district
Katihar railway division